San Gerardo is a municipality in the department of San Miguel, El Salvador. 

Municipalities of the San Miguel Department (El Salvador)